The Central Park Squirrel Census is a scientific survey to try to determine the number of squirrels in Central Park.

Based on the 2019 census, there were 2,373 Eastern Gray squirrels in Central Park.

The survey has been covered by various media.

References

External links
 Link to census

Biological censuses
Censuses in the United States
Central Park
2019 in New York City
Squirrels in human culture